Tuomarila, (Swedish Domsby) is a district of Espoo, Finland. Tuomarila has its own railway station and a primary school.

External links
 Tuomarila-seura ry 

Districts of Espoo